Miller's recurrence algorithm is a procedure for calculating a rapidly decreasing solution of a linear recurrence relation developed by J. C. P. Miller. It was originally developed to compute tables of the modified Bessel function but also applies to Bessel functions of the first kind and has other applications such as computation of the coefficients of  Chebyshev expansions of other special functions.

Many families of special functions satisfy a recurrence relation that relates the values of the functions of different orders with common argument .

The modified Bessel functions of the first kind  satisfy the recurrence relation
.
However, the modified Bessel functions of the second kind  also satisfy the same recurrence relation
.

Miller's algorithm provides a numerically stable procedure to obtain the decreasing solution.

Noting that a second sequence obtained from the trial sequence by multiplication by a constant normalizing factor will still satisfy the same recurrence relation, one can then apply a separate normalizing relationship to determine the normalizing factor that yields the actual solution.

In the example of the modified Bessel functions, a suitable normalizing relation is a summation involving the even terms of the recurrence: 

where the infinite summation becomes finite due to the approximation that  and later terms are zero.

Finally, it is confirmed that the approximation error of the procedure is acceptable by repeating the procedure with a second choice of  larger than the initial choice and confirming that the second set of results for  through  agree within the first set within the desired tolerance. Note that to obtain this agreement, the value of  must be large enough such that the term  is small compared to the desired tolerance.

Olver and Gautschi analyses the error propagation of the algorithm in detail.

For Bessel functions of the first kind, the equivalent recurrence relation and normalizing relationship are:

.

The algorithm is particularly efficient in applications that require the values of the Bessel functions for all orders  for each value of  compared to direct independent computations of  separate functions.

References 

Algorithms
Numerical analysis